UB40 are an English reggae and pop band, formed in December 1978 in Birmingham, England. The band has had more than 50 singles in the UK Singles Chart, and has also achieved considerable international success. They have been nominated for the Grammy Award for Best Reggae Album four times, and in 1984 were nominated for the Brit Award for Best British Group. UB40 have sold over 70 million records worldwide. The ethnic make-up of the band's original line-up was diverse, with musicians of English, Welsh, Irish, Jamaican, Scottish, and Yemeni parentage.

Their hit singles include their debut "Food for Thought" and two Billboard Hot 100 number ones with "Red Red Wine" and "Can't Help Falling in Love". Both of these also topped the UK Singles Chart, as did the band's version of "I Got You Babe", recorded with Chrissie Hynde. Their two most successful albums, Labour of Love (1983) and Promises and Lies (1993), reached number one on the UK Albums Chart. UB40 and the English ska band Madness hold the record for most weeks spent by a group in the UK singles chart during the 1980s, with 214 weeks each.

The band's line-up was stable for nearly 29 years, from March 1979 until January 2008, when frontman Ali Campbell left the band, followed shortly thereafter by keyboardist Mickey Virtue. Another member, Astro, remained with the band until November 2013, when he departed the original band to team up with Campbell and Virtue in a new version of UB40. In 2014, legal advice was sought by the original band (now consisting of remaining co-founding members drummer Jimmy Brown, guitarist Robin Campbell, bassist Earl Falconer, percussionist Norman Hassan, and saxophonist Brian Travers, along with new vocalist Duncan Campbell) who took action against the group containing Campbell, Virtue, and Astro over usage of the band name, due to it being used by both parties. On 5 July 2021, it was announced that Matt Doyle (formerly of the reggae band Kioko) would become the band's new vocalist, following Duncan Campbell's retirement due to ill health.

History

1978–1983: Formation and rise to stardom

The band members began as friends who knew each other from various schools across Birmingham, England. The name "UB40" was selected in reference to an attendance card issued to people claiming unemployment benefits from the UK government Department of Employment. The designation UB40 stood for Unemployment Benefit, Form 40.

The origins of what would become UB40 began when in mid-1978 guitarist Ali Campbell, together with the rhythm section of drummer Jimmy Brown and bassist Earl Falconer, began rehearsing charting reggae songs in addition to some of their own original compositions. They were soon joined by several of their friends,  firstly percussionists Yomi Babayemi and Norman Hassan, and then saxophonist Brian Travers and keyboardist Jimmy Lynn. Robin Campbell, although initially reluctant to commit to forming a band with the others, was invited to join once again by his brother and bought a guitar with which to do so in December of that year. Once Robin had joined the others in their jamming sessions, the eight musicians formed a band, deciding on the name 'UB40' after a friend suggested it was an appropriate name given the unemployed status of all of the band members. Prior to this, Travers had work as an electrical apprentice for NG Bailey; whilst Robin Campbell had been an apprentice toolmaker.

This lineup of the band lasted long enough to play their first show at the Hare & Hounds pub in Kings Heath in February 1979 and one other, before the band underwent its first lineup change in the form of Babayemi and Lynn leaving the band and Mickey Virtue joining in place of Lynn. A month later UB40's classic lineup was rounded out with the inclusion of percussionist and vocalist Astro. He had previously been working for Duke Alloy's sound system attending reggae dances in Birmingham. Before some of them could play their instruments, Ali Campbell and Brian Travers travelled around Birmingham promoting the band, putting up UB40 posters. Their sound was created and honed through many long jam sessions at various locations in Birmingham.

Their first gig took place on 9 February 1979 at The Hare & Hounds Pub in Kings Heath, Birmingham for a friend's birthday party. This was commemorated in October 2011 by the unveiling of a plaque at the venue, indicating the band receiving the Performing Rights Society's Music Heritage Award. UB40 caught their first break when Chrissie Hynde saw them at a pub and gave them an opportunity as a support act to her band, The Pretenders. UB40's first single, "King"/"Food for Thought" was released on Graduate Records, a local independent label run by David Virr. It reached No. 4 on the UK Singles Chart.

The title of their first album, Signing Off, indicates the band was signing off from, or ending, their claim for unemployment benefits. It was recorded in a bedsit in Birmingham and was produced by Bob Lamb. Norman Hassan said of the recording: "if you stripped my track down, you could hear the birds in the background." This is because his tracks were recorded outside in the garden. Signing Off was released on 29 August 1980. It entered the UK Albums Chart on 2 October 1980, and spent 71 weeks in total on the chart. Signing Off is now a Platinum album. As UB40 grew in popularity, they encouraged and supported local musicians and bands from Birmingham, such as Beshara, often bringing them on tour.

After great success in the UK, UB40's popularity in the US was established when they released Labour of Love, an album of cover songs, in 1983. The album reached number one on the UK Albums Chart and number 14 on the Billboard 200 in the US five years later. The album featured the song "Red Red Wine", a cover version of a Neil Diamond song (in an arrangement similar to that of Tony Tribe's version); it reached number one in the UK in 1983 and number one in the US in 1988. Three years later UB40 performed at the Birmingham Heart Beat Charity Concert 1986. In 1987 Ray "Pablo" Falconer, producer of UB40 music, died in a car crash. His brother, Earl Falconer, the band's bassist, was driving with nearly twice the legal limit of alcohol in his blood. Earl was sentenced to six months imprisonment in June 1988 and banned from driving for three years.

1988–2008: Continued success
On 11 June 1988, UB40 performed at the Nelson Mandela 70th Birthday Tribute concert that took place at Wembley Stadium in London and also involved Dire Straits, George Michael, Whitney Houston, the Bee Gees and other artists.

Their most successful worldwide single release is their reggae/pop version of "(I Can't Help) Falling in Love With You", which was the main title to the 1993 Sharon Stone movie Sliver; it was a number one hit across Europe and in the US. In 1995 they covered the Stevie Wonder song "Superstition" for the Eddie Murphy movie Vampire in Brooklyn and it appears on their album The Best of UB40 – Volume Two which they released that year. The group also made a guest appearance in the 1997 feature film Speed 2: Cruise Control. UB40 are featured in the 1988 film The Yob. UB40 toured South Africa in July 2007 and headlined the Live Earth concert at the Cradle of Humankind, near Johannesburg.

In 2003, UB40 and the United Colours of Sound recorded "Swing Low, Sweet Chariot" as the official anthem for the England national rugby union team. Following England's victory in the 2003 Rugby Union World Cup, it reached number 15 in the UK Singles Chart.

2008–present: Line-up changes and the current era

On 24 January 2008, it was announced that Ali Campbell would be leaving the group after 30 years. It was originally stated that this was in order for Campbell to concentrate on solo projects, but Campbell later said he was leaving due to management and business disputes.  The remaining seven members released a statement saying: "Ali made a very simple decision; he chose to pursue and put his solo career over and above continuing to work with UB40 after February 2008. It’s as simple as that".  Mickey Virtue departed shortly afterwards citing the same issues that Campbell had as reasons for his departure.

It was reported by some Birmingham newspapers on 13 March 2008, that Maxi Priest would be the new lead singer of UB40 and had recorded a cover of Bob Marley's "I Shot the Sheriff" with the band, based on information from an unnamed "source close to the band." Priest had joined UB40 on their arena tour in 2007, culminating in sell-out shows at the NEC Birmingham in December. Another local newspaper reporting that Maxi Priest would be the new UB40 frontman, also included a statement from band spokesman Gerard Franklyn which contradicted this claim: "Maxi is collaborating with the band to record material but no decision has been made to replace Ali Campbell with one definitive singer. The reports are half correct he will be appearing with them for this new recording." In April 2008, the BBC reported that Campbell was to be replaced in the band by his brother Duncan, with reggae singer Maxi Priest also bolstering the line-up on tour.

The band released their next album, TwentyFourSeven, UB40's last with their classic lineup, by way of a free insert in The Mail on Sundays 4 May 2008 issue. The newspaper sold nearly three million copies. This led to a backlash when the full 17-track version was released 21 June 2008, and most of the big retailers refused to stock it. It failed to reach the Top 75 in the UK, which was a first, as all their official albums had previously made the Top 50 on the UK Albums Chart. Their next release, on EMI, was a collection called Love Songs, which was a compilation of hits mainly from the Labour of Love series and all featuring Ali Campbell on vocals – it reached number 3 in the UK. The band toured the US, which included their first show at the Hollywood Bowl.

In 2009 the band released the first new album with their new lead singer Duncan Campbell; another in the Labour of Love cover series entitled Labour of Love IV. The album was in the charts for only two weeks reaching number 24. During the 2009 US Tour UB40 offered fans live concert recordings on USB wristbands. The wristbands also included the Dub Sessions remix album and photos.

UB40 announced that after completing a coast-to-coast 2010 American tour they would be playing a nationwide UK tour of theatres in October/November 2010 performing their seminal album Signing Off, in full, along with a second set of popular UB40 songs. To coincide, on 1 November 2010 a remastered 2CD+DVD of Signing Off was released as a '30th Anniversary Special Edition'.

In 2011 five founding members of the group and directors of their DEP International label, had bankruptcy proceedings started against them relating to debts of the record label. In October 2011 Travers, Wilson, Hassan and Brown were declared bankrupt. Former member Ali Campbell was also declared bankrupt. In 2013 a new album, Getting Over the Storm was announced, their first since 2010 and Labour of Love IV.

In November 2013, UB40 revealed dates in anticipation of their UK Tour in early 2014. The announcement of the tour followed the success of the band's latest Top 30 album, Getting Over The Storm, which was awarded BBC Radio 2's 'Album of the Week' accolade and received 5-star reviews from the UK's music press on its release in September 2013. On 22 November 2013 Astro announced in a statement that he had left the band, describing it as a "rudderless ship" and criticising the "serious lack of communication between the band and management" and the country-orientated direction of their latest album. Astro joined former UB40 members Ali Campbell and Mickey Virtue on stage at the indigO2 Arena in London on 6 December 2013, and on 17 January 2014 the trio announced on their website that they were in the studio recording new music. Ali Campbell was highly critical of his replacement in UB40, stating "I sat back for five years and watched my brother Duncan murdering my songs." Ali Campbell toured as UB40 with Astro and Virtue over the summer.  The new album Silhouette, featuring the trio, was set for release on 6 October 2014.

In December 2014 Ali Campbell claimed that he would be prepared to go to the High Court in London over the matter rather than settle out of court.

Duncan Campbell retired from UB40 in June 2021 due to ill health, following a stroke he had suffered the previous year; he was replaced the following month by Matt Doyle of fellow Birmingham reggae band Kioko.

On 22 August 2021, saxophonist Brian Travers died of cancer at the age of 62 in his Moseley home. On 6 November 2021, former vocalist and founding member Astro died following a short illness.

In August 2022, the band performed "Red Red Wine" at the Commonwealth Games Closing Ceremony, with the show also featuring other acts from Birmingham and the West Midlands region such as Musical Youth, Panjabi MC, Dexys, Ozzy Osbourne and Apache Indian. They also issued the single "Champion" in association with the Commonwealth Games with this Official Anthem being their first single to be sung by Matt Doyle. "Champion" also features Dapz on the Map and Gilly G, and can be found on the On Record compilation of Birmingham-based bands alongside "It’s a Brum Ting" by Friendly Fire Band, the track the BBC used for their Commonwealth Games coverage.

Influences
UB40 were influenced by the many blues parties they attended as teenagers in the multicultural Balsall Heath area of Birmingham.  Their love of ska, reggae and early lovers rock inspired such original tracks as "King", "Madam Medusa", "Food for Thought", "Signing Off" and "One in Ten". Their early musical style was unique, with a heavy influence of analogue synthesisers, psychedelic rock guitar, saxophone and dub producer techniques.

The Campbell brothers are the sons of the late folk musician, Ian Campbell. Their father regularly took them to folk festivals and gigs and introduced them to music and to touring. It was at his father's folk club "Jug O' Punch" that Ali Campbell made his singing debut with Dave Swarbrick's daughter, Suss, singing "Why Does It have To Be Me?".

Achievements
UB40 are one of the most commercially successful reggae acts of all time in terms of record sales (over 70 million), chart positions and touring schedule. During their three-decade long career, they have been performing sell-out shows worldwide and headlining the Reggae Sunsplash music festival in Jamaica, as well as spreading reggae to Russia, South America, etc. They have performed twice at the Night of the Proms, in 2000 and in 2006. They have been nominated for the Grammy Award for Best Reggae Album four times, and in 1984 were nominated for the Brit Award for Best British Group.

In October 2011, UB40 were commemorated with a Heritage Award, a ceremonial plaque from the UK's PRS for Music. A plaque was placed at the Hare & Hounds Pub in Birmingham, England, the location where they played their first gig.

All three of their UK number one hits and four of their five US top ten hits were cover versions. UB40 collaborators include: Pato Banton, Madness, Bitty McLean, Chrissie Hynde, Maxi Priest, Robert Palmer, Hunterz, Japanese artist Mikidozan, French artist Nuttea, Lady Saw, Afrika Bambaataa, 808 State. With 214 weeks spent on the UK singles charts over the course of the 1980s, UB40 and Madness hold the record for most weeks spent by a group in the 1980s UK singles charts.

Referencing the group's longevity, Ali Campbell has said that the group was fortunate in choosing a relatively young genre, as reggae "... hasn't outlived its own cool like jazz has".

Band members

Current members
 Jimmy Brown – drums 
 Robin Campbell – guitar, vocals 
 Earl Falconer – bass guitar, vocals 
 Norman Hassan – percussion, trombone, vocals 
 Matt Doyle – lead vocals, guitar 

Current touring musicians
 Laurence Parry – trumpet, flugelhorn, trombone 
 Martin Meredith – saxophone, keyboards 
 Tony Mullings – keyboards 
 Ian Thompson – saxophone 

Former members
 Ali Campbell – guitar, lead vocals 
 Yomi Babayemi – percussion 
 Jimmy Lynn – keyboards 
 Brian Travers – saxophone 
 Mickey Virtue – keyboards 
 Astro – percussion, trumpet, vocals, toasting 
 Duncan Campbell – lead vocals 

Former touring musicians
 Henry Tenyue – trombone 
 Patrick Tenyue – trumpet

Timeline

Biographies

Astro
Terence Oswald Wilson (24 June 1957 – 6 November 2021), better known by his stage name Astro,  was a British musician, rapper, and toaster, who was part of UB40 from 1979 until he left the group in November 2013. His nickname comes from his childhood as he wore a pair of Dr. Martens boots with the model name "Astronaut".

He went to school with the future keyboard player of UB40, Virtue. While DJ-ing, he met the Campbell brothers, and bonded so well with them over a love of Jamaican music that they invited him to join them as their MC. He believed that reggae music was for everyone, and shouldn't just be for Jamaican Rastafarians.

In the band's 1983 version of Red Red Wine, he added his own "toasting" lyrics, which is a Jamaican forerunner to rapping. This became an integral part to the group's sound. Astro offered the band a more militant edge, rapping about social injustice and racism. He encountered racism himself when he was refused admittance to nightclubs on account of his dreadlocks, when white members of the band were welcomed.

He eventually quit the band in 2013 after they decided to record a set of country songs. He wasn't interested in this genre of music and was only interested in performing and promoting reggae. He went on to join Ali Campbell and Virtue in a Rival band to UB40.

Astro died following a short illness on 6 November 2021, at the age of 64.

Duncan Campbell

Duncan Campbell (born 3 April 1958 in Birmingham) is an English musician and former lead singer of UB40. He joined the band in 2008 after the departure of his brother Ali Campbell, the former UB40 lead singer. Current bandmate Robin Campbell is also his brother, and he is the son of the late folk singer Ian Campbell. Campbell announced his retirement from live concert performances after suffering a seizure in August 2020. His replacement as lead singer was announced on 5 July 2021 as Matt Doyle, formerly of the band Kioko.

Campbell sang in a harmony group with his brothers as children and performed with their father on stage. He also recorded a reggae album in Jamaica for his brother Ali's record label, but it was never released. He was a professional spoon player. "I was the only professional spoon player in the country registered with the Musicians' Union – until they registered me as a vocalist," said Campbell. He also worked as a casino manager in Barbados, ran a fish and chip shop in Perth, Australia, and has worked as an actor.

On 24 January 2008, UB40 lead singer Ali Campbell announced that he was leaving the band after a dispute with the management; UB40 announced that they would carry on. On 30 April 2008, UB40 unveiled Duncan as their new lead singer.

Duncan was offered the position of lead singer in 1978, but turned it down at the time, and said that he "wouldn't get the chance in another 30 years". Ali Campbell was "disappointed but didn't object" to him joining UB40. When asked why he did not join UB40 in 1978, he joked because they were "crap" and that he "was too smart for them and he knew that they would get nowhere". In 2014, Ali formed a rival version of UB40 with Astro and Mickey Virtue. He said of his brother's singing, "I sat back for five years and watched my brother Duncan murdering my songs. We're saving the legacy". Duncan suffered a stroke in August 2020 and announced his retirement from the band in June 2021, citing ill health.

Earl Falconer
Earl Acton Falconer (born 23 January 1959 in Meriden, Warwickshire) is a British bass player and singer in UB40. Falconer also co-founded the UK bass label Circus Records alongside Flux Pavilion, Doctor P and DJ Swan-E.

Falconer attended St. Benedict's junior school and Mosely Road School of Art. He was an unemployed plasterer at the time of UB40's formation.

Norman Hassan
Norman Lamont Hassan (born 26 January 1958) is a British musician of Yemeni and Welsh descent who is best known as being a member of UB40 since its foundation in 1978. Norman Lamont Hassan was born in Birmingham to Yemeni and Welsh parents, and attended Park Hill School and later Queensbridge School in the city. He worked as a carpet fitter before joining the band UB40 in 1978.
After starting off as percussionist in 1978, he learned the trombone in 1981, when the band decided to add a brass section. He sang his first lead vocal on Labour of Love. He is also known for his on-stage dancing. Like the rest of UB40, he still lives in the City of Birmingham. He is also a fan of the local football club Birmingham City. He has wide-ranging musical tastes, from reggae to soul to opera.

Brian Travers
Brian David Travers was one of the founders of the band. He played the saxophone and was also an arranger and lyricist. He had suffered from cancer since 2019 and he died in August 2021. Travers was a founding member of the socialist Workers Party of Britain in 2019.

UB40 featuring Ali Campbell and Astro

In January 2014, Astro, with other former UB40 members Ali Campbell, and Mickey Virtue, announced plans to reform and record under the UB40 name. The band released their new song, "Reggae Music" as a free download in January 2014. In February, with the original band and the newly formed splinter group both due to perform in Dubai under the name UB40 within a few months of each other, the new group announced a name change to 'UB40 Reunited'. Then the splinter group changed their name again, settling on 'UB40 featuring Ali, Astro, and Mickey', until late 2018 when Virtue departed the band, after which they continued touring and recording as 'UB40 featuring Ali Campbell and Astro'. Astro died on 6 November 2021 after recording tracks for the band's new album Unprecedented.
 The first single from these sessions, "Sufferer", was released in February 2022, with the album due to be released by UMC on 17 June 2022.

Matt Hoy
Ali Campbell's UB40 splinter group also featured the vocalist Matt Hoy until he quit in July 2021. On the week of 20 March 2022, Hoy's new single "We Are One" appeared on the countdown as shown on The Heritage Chart Show with Mike Read, one place above his former bandmates new single "Sufferer", with Hoy invited to perform his song live in the studio on the programme as broadcast of Talking Pictures TV on 10 April 2022.

Discography

Signing Off (1980)
Present Arms (1981)
UB44 (1982)
Labour of Love (1983)
Geffery Morgan (1984)
Baggariddim (1985)
Rat in the Kitchen (1986)
UB40 (1988)
Labour of Love II (1989)
Promises and Lies (1993)
Guns in the Ghetto (1997)
Labour of Love III (1998)
Cover Up (2001)
Homegrown (2003)
Who You Fighting For? (2005)
TwentyFourSeven (2008)
Labour of Love IV (2010)
Getting Over the Storm (2013)
For the Many (2019)
Bigga Baggariddim (2021)

See also
List of best-selling music artists
List of dub artists
Gary Tyler – biographical subject of a song by UB40

References

External links

UB40 official web site
UB40 featuring Ali, Astro and Mickey
UB40 at Rolling Stone
UB40 discography at Discogs
 

1978 establishments in England
A&M Records artists
British reggae musical groups
Musical groups established in 1978
Musical groups from Birmingham, West Midlands
Sibling musical groups
Virgin Records artists
20th-century saxophonists